Karen Putzer (born 29 September 1978) is a former Italian alpine skier.

Biography
She was born in Bolzano, Italy. A specialist of Giant Slalom and Super-G, she won a total of eight World Cup victories, arriving second in the overall classment in the 2002–2003 season behind Janica Kostelić. However, her career was often hampered by accidents. She won a bronze medal at the 2002 Winter Olympics at Salt Lake City.

World Cup victories

See also
 Italian skiers who closed in top 10 in overall World Cup

References

External links
 

1978 births
Living people
Sportspeople from Bolzano
Germanophone Italian people
Italian female alpine skiers
Alpine skiers at the 1998 Winter Olympics
Alpine skiers at the 2002 Winter Olympics
Alpine skiers at the 2006 Winter Olympics
Olympic alpine skiers of Italy
Olympic bronze medalists for Italy
Olympic medalists in alpine skiing
Medalists at the 2002 Winter Olympics
Alpine skiers of Fiamme Oro